KS2 or KS-2 may refer to:

 Kansas's 2nd congressional district, to the United States House of Representatives
 K-2 (Kansas highway), an American road
 Key Stage 2, a British term in primary education